Saint Augustine in His Study, is a painting by the Italian Renaissance master Sandro Botticelli, finished around 1490–1494. It is housed in the Uffizi, in Florence.

This work was probably executed for an Augustinian hermit of Santo Spirito, as shown by the fact the saint wears both episcopal and hermit garments.

As many of Botticelli's late works, it is inspired by the preaching of Savonarola.

See also
Saint Augustine in His Study (Botticelli, Ognissanti)

External links

Page at artonline.it 

1490s paintings
Paintings by Sandro Botticelli in the Uffizi
Paintings of Augustine of Hippo
Books in art